Žebrák or Żebrak may refer to places:

Žebrák, a town in the Central Bohemian Region of the Czech Republic
Žebrák Castle, a ruined castle near Žebrák in the Točník municipality
Žebrák, a village and part of Nečín in the Central Bohemian Region of the Czech Republic
Żebrak, a village in Masovian Voivodeship, Poland